Birgorima is a genus of moths in the subfamily Arctiinae. It contains the single species Birgorima pulchripicta, which is found in Sarawak.

External links

Natural History Museum Lepidoptera generic names catalog

Lithosiini